Nahed Yousri, also romanised as Nahied Yousri (born 10 May 1949) is an Egyptian actress.

Biography
Born Nahed Hassan Shukri, she followed her sister Samia Shukri and made her first appearance in cinema by 1965. Following a prolific career, her ground-breaking role came with The Lady of the Black Moons (1971), and A Woman of Fire (1971) was a commercial hit and was followed by a number of other Lebanese films that often featured her in erotic contexts. In mid-1980s, she acted in various Egyptian TV series. Her retirement was with Yasin Ismail Yasin's 1990 film Disappeared Wife.

References

External links
Nahied Yousri at ElCinema
 

Egyptian film actresses
1949 births
Living people